Invermay is a village in the Canadian province of Saskatchewan within the Rural Municipality of Invermay No. 305 and Census Division No. 9. Invermay is about 50 km west of Canora or about 50 km east of Wadena on Highway 5.

History 
Invermay incorporated as a village on September 1, 1908.

Demographics 

Notable people
Ken Krawetz, served as a Saskatchewan MLA for the riding of Canora-Pelly from 1995-2016

See also 

 List of communities in Saskatchewan
 Villages of Saskatchewan

References

Villages in Saskatchewan
Invermay No. 305, Saskatchewan
Division No. 9, Saskatchewan